Forest is a 2003 Hungarian drama film directed by Benedek Fliegauf. It was selected as the Hungarian entry for the Best Foreign Language Film at the 76th Academy Awards, but it was not nominated.

Cast
 Rita Braun
 Barbara Csonka
 Laszlo Cziffer
 Gábor Dióssy
 Bálint Kenyeres

See also
 List of submissions to the 76th Academy Awards for Best Foreign Language Film
 List of Hungarian submissions for the Academy Award for Best International Feature Film

References

External links
 

2003 films
2003 drama films
Hungarian drama films
2000s Hungarian-language films